The American Idols Live! Tour 2013 is a summer concert tour in the United States and Canada that features the Top 10 finalists of the 12th season of American Idol, as well as semi-finalist Aubrey Cleland, the winner of the season's sing-off. This was the second time after 2011 tour to have 11 performers. The tour was scheduled to begin on June 29, 2013 in St. Louis, Missouri and ended on August 31, 2013 in Nashville, Tennessee. However, 10 shows were canceled and were cut to 30 shows, the tour started on July 19, 2013 in Kent, Washington.

Performers

Setlist
 Girls – "Wings" (Little Mix)
 Aubrey Cleland – "Sweet Dreams" (Beyoncé Knowles)
 Burnell Taylor, Devin Velez, Curtis Finch, Jr. – "Suit & Tie" (Justin Timberlake)
 Paul Jolley – "Blown Away" (Carrie Underwood)
 Kree Harrison, Janelle Arthur, and Jolley – "Summer Nights" (Rascal Flatts)
 Finch – "When I Was Your Man" (Bruno Mars)
 Amber Holcomb – "We Found Love" (Rihanna)
 Holcomb, Cleland, and Angie Miller – "The Way" (Ariana Grande)
 Guys – "Locked Out of Heaven" (Bruno Mars)
 Velez – "Somos Novios (It's Impossible)"  (Perry Como) 
 Miller, Holcomb, Arthur, and Cleland – "Blurred Lines" (Robin Thicke)
 Taylor and Holcomb – "Diamonds" (Rihanna)
 Taylor – "Everybody Knows" (John Legend)
 All – "We Are Young" / "Live While We're Young" (Fun / One Direction)

Intermission
 Angie Miller – "Mamma Knows Best" (Jessie J), "You Set Me Free" (Angie Miller), "Put It on Me" (Angie Miller)
 Arthur – "Better Dig Two" (The Band Perry), "Where the Blacktop Ends" (Keith Urban)
 Lazaro Arbos – "Feeling Good" (Nina Simone), "The Edge of Glory" (Lady Gaga)
 Harrison – "Up to the Mountain (MLK Song)" (Patty Griffin), "Hold On" (Alabama Shakes), "All Cried Out" (Kree Harrison)
 Candice Glover – "End of Time" (Beyoncé), "I Am Beautiful" (Candice Glover), "In the Middle" (Candice Glover), "Lovesong" (The Cure)
 All – "Gone" ('N Sync), "Since U Been Gone" (Kelly Clarkson), "Cups" (Anna Kendrick), "Gone, Gone, Gone" (Phillip Phillips)

Tour dates

Cancelled & Rescheduled Shows

Cancelled
 St. Louis, Missouri on June 29
 Kansas City, Missouri on June 30
 Minneapolis, Minnesota on July 2
 Detroit, Michigan on July 5
 Tulsa, Oklahoma, on July 8
 Broomfield, Colorado on July 10
 Las Vegas, Nevada on July 12
 Ontario, California on July 13
 Oakland, California on July 14
 Trenton, New Jersey on August 12

Rescheduled
 Rosemont, Illinois moved from July 6 to August 12 (which replaces Trenton, New Jersey)

Revenue
The tour was ranked No. 186 in the list of 2013 Year-end Top 200 North American tours, based on total gross income .

References

American Idol concert tours
2013 concert tours